The Bride of Death (Italian: Sposa nella morte!) is a 1915 Italian silent drama film directed by Emilio Ghione and starring Lina Cavalieri. It was shot on location in Paris and Rome, with Cavalieri's contract giving her a percentage of the profits. It was released in the United States the following year, under the alternative title of The Shadow of Her Past, but was not well received.

Cast
 Angelo Bonfanti 
 Ida Carloni Talli 
 Alfonso Cassini 
 Lina Cavalieri 
 Alberto Collo 
 Diomira Jacobini
 Lucien Muratore 
 Luigi Scotto

References

Bibliography
 Paul Fryer, Olga Usova. Lina Cavalieri: The Life of Opera's Greatest Beauty, 1874-1944. McFarland, 2003.

External links
 

1915 films
1915 drama films
1910s Italian-language films
Italian silent feature films
Italian drama films
Films directed by Emilio Ghione
Italian black-and-white films
Silent drama films